"The Korven" is an episode in the Australian-British science fiction drama television series K-9. It is the third episode of Series 1.

Synopsis
Starkey is homeless so K-9 and Jorjie try to help. Meanwhile, the Korven kidnaps Professor Gryffen so Darius, K-9, Starkey and Jorjie must try to save him.

Plot
K-9 and Starkey are hiding from The Department's surveillance, K-9 wonders when Gryffen will fix the STM so he can go home. Back at the mansion, Gryffen is at work on the STM hoping to use its time-travel abilities and rests to have lunch with Darius. Unknown to them, the STM sends out an alien creature. When Gryffen complains that it's cold, Darius goes to warm the room up. While he does this, the alien sneaks up on Gryffen and when Darius turns around he is nowhere to be seen. Meanwhile June and Jorjie are going back from shopping, June then leaves to go to work. Back at the mansion, Darius is searching for the professor.

Starkey is eating with K-9 when Jorjie meets them. They are contacted by Darius who alerts them of Gryffen's disappearance. When K-9 detects Phosphane gas in the last known place the Professor was seen. When they receive a message through the STM by a Human soldier from the year 2618 who informs them of the Korven threat. He reveals the Korven are after a group of scientists who created a system to cool the Earth in 2050, they go to search for the professor. The Korven take the professor to their hideout where they prepare to extract his brainwaves, but K-9 and his friends are on the Korven's trail. They split up, the Korven began the leeching process. While Starkey and K-9 observe another Korven kidnaps Starkey and K-9 flees to Jorjie and Darius. They manage to find the professor and the Korven, who is completely still (to focus all attention on leeching the professor). Darius destroys the Korven's backpack, gaining its attention. K-9 shoots the Korven which makes K-9 confused. When it regains consciousness and attacks Starkey convinces K-9 to use his Photon beam which destroys them Korven.

Back at the mansion Gryffen manages to alter Starkey's Department encryption code, so Starkey is no longer on the run, and offers the mansion as a place for Starkey to stay.

Continuity
There was a production error when early publicity for this episode states the Korven invaded Earth in the 50th century, however the actual episode states the Korven came from the year 2618 and invaded earth in 2480.
"The Korven" is the third of three parts, the first being "Regeneration" and the second being "Liberation".

External links 
 
 K9 Official
 The Doctor Who Site

K-9 (TV series) episodes
2010 British television episodes
Television episodes about abduction